S. militaris  may refer to:
 Sophronitis militaris, a synonym for Sophronitis coccinea, an orchid species found from Brazil to Argentina
 Sturnella militaris, the red-breasted blackbird, a passerine bird species found from southwestern Costa Rica and Trinidad, south to northeastern Peru and central Brazil

See also
 Militaris (disambiguation)